The 2015 Pittsburgh Pirates season was the franchise's 134th season overall, the  129th season as a member of National League, and 15th season at PNC Park. The regular season began with a loss at Great American Ball Park against the Cincinnati Reds on April 6 and ended with a win against the Reds at PNC Park on October 4. The Pirates finished the regular season with the second best record in baseball, finishing in second place for the third consecutive year in the National League Central Division with 98 wins and 64 losses.

The Pirates clinched their third consecutive playoff berth on September 23, finishing second in their division behind the St. Louis Cardinals. The team secured one of two NL Wild Card spots. The Pirates lost to the Chicago Cubs in the 2015 National League Wild Card Game on October 7 and were, as a result, eliminated from the 2015 postseason.

Four members of the 2015 Pirates were selected to represent the National League in the All-Star Game, including pitcher A. J. Burnett for the first time in his career in his final major league season. In addition, one player was named NL Player of the Month: Andrew McCutchen in August, one was named NL Rookie of the Month: Jung-ho Kang in July, and one was named NL Pitcher of the Month: Gerrit Cole in April. On October 2, the penultimate game of the regular season, the Pirates set a PNC Park season attendance record for the second consecutive year at 2,498,596, beating the record set in 2014 (2,442,564).

Season standings

National League Central

National League playoff standings

Record vs. opponents

Detailed records

Regular season

April
April 8 – Offseason bidding acquisition Jung-ho Kang makes his MLB debut after nine years playing in the South Korean KBO League.
April 9 – The Pirates are swept by the Cincinnati Reds in the first series of the regular season.
Gerrit Cole is named NL Pitcher of the Month for April.
The Pirates finish the month with a win–loss record of 12–10, third in the NL Central at 3.5 games out of first.

May

May 26 – Andrew McCutchen (OF) is named NL Player of the Week for the week ending May 24.
The Pirates finish the month with a win–loss record of 26–24, third in the NL Central at 7.0 games out of first.

June
June 12 – Clint Hurdle earns his 900th career win as a manager in a Pirates victory at home over the Philadelphia Phillies.
June 20 – The Pirates are no-hit by Max Scherzer of the Washington Nationals, but a perfect game was broken up when Scherzer hit José Tábata in the elbow.
The Pirates finish the month with a win–loss record of 43–33, second in the NL Central at 8.0 games out of first.

July
July 6 – A. J. Burnett (P), Gerrit Cole (P), Andrew McCutchen (OF), and Mark Melancon (P) are named to the National League All-Star team.
July 12 – The Pirates enter the All-Star break with a win–loss record of 53–35, second in the NL Central and second-best in MLB.
Jung-ho Kang is named NL Rookie of the Month for July.
The Pirates finish the month with a win–loss record of 60–42, second in the NL Central at 5.5 games out of first.

August

August 10 – Andrew McCutchen is named NL Player of the Week for the second time in 2015 for the week ending August 9.
Andrew McCutchen is named NL Player of the Month for August.
The Pirates finish the month with a win–loss record of 79–50, second in the NL Central at 5.0 games out of first.

September
September 20 – Mark Melancon records his 47th save of the season, breaking the all-time Pirates franchise record set by Mike Williams in 2002.
September 23 – The Pirates clinch their third consecutive playoff berth with an away win against the Colorado Rockies.
September 24 – The Pirates achieve a come-from-behind win against the Rockies on the strength of an 8th inning Pedro Alvarez three-run home run, earning the franchise's 10,000th win since joining the National League in 1887.
September 26 – The Pirates earn their 95th win of the season, ensuring their best season-end win–loss record since 1992.
September 30 – The Cardinals clinch the division, ensuring the Pirates' third consecutive appearance in the NL Wild Card game.

October
October 2 – During the final homestand of 2015, the Pirates set a new PNC Park attendance record for the second consecutive year at 2,498,596, a 56,032 increase over 2014.
October 4 – At the conclusion of the season, the Pirates had a win–loss record of 98–64, finishing second in the NL Central behind the St. Louis Cardinals with the second-best record in Major League Baseball. The Pirates clinched home-field advantage for the NL Wild Card game on the last day of the season, finishing one game ahead of the Chicago Cubs, whom they would face in the play-in game.

Game log

|- bgcolor="ffbbbb"
| 1 || April 6 || @ Reds || 2–5 || Diaz (1–0) || Watson (0–1) || Chapman (1) || 43,633 || 0–1
|- bgcolor="ffbbbb"
| 2 || April 8 || @ Reds || 4–5 (11) || Hoover (1–0) || Liz (0–1) || — || 30,859 || 0–2
|- bgcolor="ffbbbb"
| 3 || April 9 || @ Reds || 2–3 || Chapman (1–0) || Scahill (0–1) || — || 15,616 || 0–3
|- bgcolor="ccffcc"
| 4 || April 10 || @ Brewers || 6–2 || Locke (1–0) || Fiers (0–1) || — || 27,373 || 1–3
|- bgcolor="ffbbbb"
| 5 || April 11 || @ Brewers || 0–6 || Nelson (1–0) || Worley (0–1) || — || 41,108 || 1–4
|- bgcolor="ccffcc"
| 6 || April 12 || @ Brewers || 10–2 || Sadler (1–0) || Lohse (0–2) || — || 39,017 || 2–4
|- bgcolor="ccffcc"
| 7 || April 13 || Tigers || 5–4 || Cole (1–0) || Sánchez (1–1) || — || 39,933 || 3–4
|- bgcolor="ffbbbb"
| 8 || April 14 || Tigers || 0–2 || Greene (2–0) || Burnett (0–1) || Soria (3) || 31,755 || 3–5
|- bgcolor="ffbbbb"
| 9 || April 15 || Tigers || 0–1 || Simón (2–0) || Liriano (0–1) || Soria (4) || 19,509 || 3–6
|- bgcolor="ccffcc"
| 10 || April 17 || Brewers || 6–3 || Worley (1–1) || Nelson (1–1) || Melancon (1) || 25,664 || 4–6
|- bgcolor="ccffcc"
| 11 || April 18 || Brewers || 6–2 || Locke (2–0) || Lohse (0–3) || — || 33,961 || 5–6
|- bgcolor="ccffcc"
| 12 || April 19 || Brewers || 5–2 || Cole (2–0) || Garza (1–2) || Melancon (2) || 28,129 || 6–6
|- bgcolor="ffbbbb"
| 13 || April 20 || Cubs || 2–5 || Arrieta (2–1) || Caminero (0–1) || — || 11,777 || 6–7
|- bgcolor="ffbbbb"
| 14 || April 21 || Cubs || 8–9 || Jackson (1–0) || Melancon (0–1) || Rondon (3) || 13,680 || 6–8
|- bgcolor="ccffcc"
| 15 || April 22 || Cubs || 4–3 || Worley (2–1) || Hammel (1–1) || Watson (1) || 15,101 || 7–8
|- bgcolor="ccffcc"
| 16 || April 23 || Cubs || 5–4 || Liz (1–1) || Schlitter (0–2) || Melancon (3) || 22,224 || 8–8
|- bgcolor="ccffcc"
| 17 || April 24 || @ Diamondbacks || 4–1 || Cole (3–0) || Collmenter (1–3) || Melancon (4) || 24,427 || 9–8
|- bgcolor="ccffcc"
| 18 || April 25 || @ Diamondbacks || 2–1 || Watson (1–1) || Reed (0–1) || Melancon (5) || 38,859 || 10–8
|- bgcolor="ccffcc"
| 19 || April 26 || @ Diamondbacks || 8–0 || Liriano (1–1) || Hellickson (1–3) || — || 32,353 || 11–8
|- bgcolor="ffbbbb"
| 20 || April 27 || @ Cubs || 0–4 || Hammel (2–1) || Worley (2–2) || — || 29,159 || 11–9
|- bgcolor="ffbbbb"
| 21 || April 28 || @ Cubs || 2–6 || Wood (2–1) || Locke (2–1) || — || 29,915 || 11–10
|- bgcolor="ccffcc"
| 22 || April 29 || @ Cubs || 8–1 || Cole (4–0) || Hendricks (0–1) || — || 30,634 || 12–10
|-

|- bgcolor="ffbbbb"
| 23 || May 1 || @ Cardinals || 1–2 (10) || Choate (1–0) || Scahill (0–2) || — || 40,912 || 12–11
|- bgcolor="ffbbbb"
| 24 || May 2 || @ Cardinals || 1–2 (11) || Villanueva (3–1) || Hughes (0–1) || — || 45,095 || 12–12
|- bgcolor="ffbbbb"
| 25 || May 3 || @ Cardinals || 2–3 (14) || Socolovich (1–0) || Liz (1–2) || — || 44,382 || 12–13
|- bgcolor="ffbbbb"
| 26 || May 5 || Reds || 1–7 || Lorenzen (1–1) || Locke (2–2) || — || 16,822 || 12–14
|- bgcolor="ffbbbb"
| 27 || May 6 || Reds || 0–3 || Leake (2–1) || Cole (4–1) || Chapman (6) || 16,527 || 12–15
|- bgcolor="ccffcc"
| 28 || May 7 || Reds || 7–2 || Burnett (1–1) || DeSclafani (2–3) || — || 27,302 || 13–15
|- bgcolor="ffbbbb"
| 29 || May 8 || Cardinals || 5–8 || Wacha (5–0) || Liriano (1–2) || Rosenthal (11) || 33,507 || 13–16
|- bgcolor="ccffcc"
| 30 || May 9 || Cardinals || 7–5 || Scahill (1–2) || Martinez (3–1) || Melancon (6) || 38,068 || 14–16
|- bgcolor="ccffcc"
| 31 || May 10 || Cardinals || 4–3 || Hughes (1–1) || Harris (1–1) || Melancon (7) || 34,036 || 15–16
|- bgcolor="ccffcc"
| 32 || May 11 || @ Phillies || 4–3 || Cole (5–1) || Williams (2–3) || Melancon (8) || 21,358 || 16–16
|- bgcolor="ccffcc"
| 33 || May 12 || @ Phillies || 7–2 || Burnett (2–1) || O'Sullivan (0–2) || — || 20,393 || 17–16
|- bgcolor="ffbbbb"
| 34 || May 13 || @ Phillies || 2–3 || Hamels (3–3) || Liriano (1–3) || Papelbon (7) || 29,576 || 17–17
|- bgcolor="ffbbbb"
| 35 || May 14 || @ Phillies || 2–4 || Harang (4–3) || Worley (2–3) || Papelbon (8) || 29,205 || 17–18
|- bgcolor="ffbbbb"
| 36 || May 15 || @ Cubs || 10–11 (12) || Jackson (2–1) || Liz (1–3) || — || 33,617 || 17–19
|- bgcolor="ffbbbb"
| 37 || May 16 || @ Cubs || 1–4 || Lester (4–2) || Cole (5–2) || Wood (1) || 38,883 || 17–20 
|- bgcolor="ccffcc"
| 38 || May 17 || @ Cubs || 3–0 || Burnett (3–1) || Arrieta (4–4) || Melancon (9) || 36,289 || 18–20
|- bgcolor="ffbbbb"
| 39 || May 19 || Twins || 5–8 || Nolasco (4–1) || Liriano (1–4) || Perkins (14) || 22,357 || 18–21
|- bgcolor="ffbbbb"
| 40 || May 20 || Twins || 3–4 (13) || Duensing (2–0) || Bastardo (0–1) || Perkins (15) || 21,718 || 18–22 
|- bgcolor="ccffcc"
| 41 || May 22 || Mets || 4–1 || Cole (6–2) || Syndergaard (1–2) || Melancon (10) || 33,337 || 19–22
|- bgcolor="ccffcc"
| 42 || May 23 || Mets || 8–2 || Burnett (4–1) || Harvey (5–2) || — || 39,385 || 20–22
|- bgcolor="ccffcc"
| 43 || May 24 || Mets || 9–1 || Liriano (2–4) || Niese (3–5) || — || 37,784 || 21–22
|- bgcolor="ccffcc"
| 44 || May 25 || Marlins || 4–2 || Morton (1–0) || Phelps (2–2) || Melancon (11) || 20,046 || 22–22
|- bgcolor="ccffcc"
| 45 || May 26 || Marlins || 5–1 || Locke (3–2) || Urena (0–1) || — || 20,806 || 23–22
|- bgcolor="ccffcc"
| 46 || May 27 || Marlins || 5–2 || Cole (7–2) || Dyson (2–2) || Melancon (12) || 33,238 || 24–22
|- bgcolor="ccffcc"
| 47 || May 28 || @ Padres || 11–5 || Burnett (5–1) || Kennedy (2–5) || — || 23,104 || 25–22
|- bgcolor="ffbbbb"
| 48 || May 29 || @ Padres || 2–6 || Kimbrel (1–1) || Scahill (1–3) || — || 28,317 || 25–23
|- bgcolor="ccffcc"
| 49 || May 30 || @ Padres || 5–2 || Morton (2–0) || Ross (2–5) || Melancon (13) || 43,207 || 26–23
|- bgcolor="ffbbbb"
| 50 || May 31 || @ Padres || 1–7 || Despaigne (3–3) || Locke (3–3) || — || 20,556 || 26–24
|-

|- bgcolor="ccffcc"
| 51 || June 1 || @ Giants || 4–3 || Cole (8–2) || Vogelsong (4–3) || Melancon (14) || 41,546 || 27–24
|- bgcolor="ccffcc"
| 52 || June 2 || @ Giants || 7–4 || Burnett (6–1) || Heston (5–4) || Melancon (15) || 41,913 || 28–24
|- bgcolor="ccffcc"
| 53 || June 3 || @ Giants || 5–2 || Liriano (3–4) || Hudson (3–5) || Melancon (16) || 41,495 || 29–24 
|- bgcolor="ccffcc"
| 54 || June 5 || @ Braves || 10–8 || Morton (3–0) || Avilán (2–1) || Melancon (17) || 27,508 || 30–24
|- bgcolor="ffbbbb"
| 55 || June 6 || @ Braves || 4–5 || Grilli (1–2) || Worley (2–4) || — || 33,268 || 30–25
|- bgcolor="ccffcc"
| 56 || June 7 || @ Braves || 3–0 || Cole (9–2) || Wood (4–3) || Melancon (18) || 24,146 || 31–25
|- bgcolor="ffbbbb"
| 57 || June 8 || Brewers || 0–2 || Nelson (3–6) || Burnett (6–2) || Rodriguez (11) || 18,016 || 31–26
|- bgcolor="ffbbbb"
| 58 || June 9 || Brewers || 1–4 || Jungmann (1–0) || Liriano (3–5) || Rodriguez (12) || 20,672 || 31–27
|- bgcolor="ccffcc"
| 59 || June 10 || Brewers || 2–0 || Morton (4–0) || Lohse (3–7) || Melancon (19) || 26,269 || 32–27
|- bgcolor="ccffcc"
| 60 || June 12 || Phillies || 1–0 (13) || Bastardo (1–1) || McGowan (1–2) || — || 33,749 || 33–27
|- bgcolor="ccffcc"
| 61 || June 13 || Phillies || 4–3 || Cole (10–2) || O'Sullivan (1–5) || Melancon (20) || 37,516 || 34–27
|- bgcolor="ccffcc"
| 62 || June 14 || Phillies || 1–0 (11) || Bastardo (2–1) || Papelbon (1–1) || — || 34,518 || 35–27
|- bgcolor="ccffcc"
| 63 || June 15 || White Sox || 11–0 || Liriano (4–5) || Rodon (2–1) || — || 24,536 || 36–27
|- bgcolor="ccffcc"
| 64 || June 16 || White Sox || 3–0 || Morton (5–0) || Quintana (3–7) || Melancon (21) || 28,413 || 37–27
|- bgcolor="ccffcc"
| 65 || June 17 || @ White Sox || 3–2 || Locke (4–3) || Danks (3–7) || Melancon (22) || 19,194 || 38–27
|- bgcolor="ccffcc"
| 66 || June 18 || @ White Sox || 3–2 || Cole (11–2) || Petricka (1–2) || Melancon (23) || 21,296 || 39–27
|- bgcolor="ffbbbb"
| 67 || June 19 || @ Nationals || 1–4 || Ross (2–1)  || Burnett (6–3) || Storen (20) || 38,935 || 39–28
|- bgcolor="ffbbbb"
| 68 || June 20 || @ Nationals || 0–6 || Scherzer (8–5) || Liriano (4–6) || — || 41,104 || 39–29
|- bgcolor="ffbbbb"
| 69 || June 21 || @ Nationals || 2–9 || Gonzalez (5–4) || Morton (5–1)|| — || 40,015 || 39–30
|- bgcolor="ccffcc"
| 70 || June 23 || Reds || 7–6 || Scahill (2–3) || Villarreal (0–2) || Melancon (24) || 26,949 || 40–30
|- bgcolor="ffbbbb"
| 71 || June 24 || Reds || 2–5 || Leake (5–4) || Cole (11–3) || Hoover (1) || 37,659 || 40–31
|- bgcolor="ffbbbb"
| 72 || June 25 || Reds || 4–5 (13) || Villarreal (1–2) || Scahill (2–4) || — || 35,015 || 40–32
|- bgcolor="ccffcc"
| 73 || June 26 || Braves || 3–2 (10) || Melancon (1–1) || Grilli (2–3) || — || 34,220 || 41–32
|- bgcolor="ccffcc"
| 74 || June 27 || Braves || 8–4 || Morton (6–1) || Teherán (5–4) || — || 36,417 || 42–32
|- bgcolor="ffbbbb"
| 75 || June 28 || Braves || 1–2 || Wood (5–5) || Locke (4–4) || Grilli (21) || 36,082 || 42–33
|- bgcolor="ccffcc"
| 76 || June 30 || @ Tigers || 5–4 (14) || Guerra (1–0) || Gorzelanny (1–2) || — || 33,899 || 43–33
|-

|- bgcolor="ccffcc"
| 77 || July 1 || @ Tigers || 9–3 || Burnett (7–3) || Simón (7–5) || — || 31,351 || 44–33
|- bgcolor="ccffcc"
| 78 || July 2 || @ Tigers || 8–4 || Liriano (5–6) || Ryan (1–2) || Melancon (25) || 34,680 || 45–33
|- bgcolor="ffbbbb"
| 79 || July 3 || Indians || 2–5 || Bauer (7–5) || Morton (6–2) || Allen (16) || 38,840 || 45–34
|- bgcolor="ccffcc"
| 80 || July 4 || Indians || 1–0 || Locke (5–4) || Anderson (1–1) || Melancon (26) || 37,928 || 46–34
|- bgcolor="ccffcc"
| 81 || July 5 || Indians || 5–3 || Cole (12–3) || Salazar (7–4) || Melancon (27) || 36,812 || 47–34
|- bgcolor="ccffcc"
| 82 || July 6 || Padres || 2–1 || Hughes (2–1) || Maurer (5–2) || — || 23,182 || 48–34
|- bgcolor="ccffcc"
| 83 || July 7 || Padres || 3–2 || Watson (2–1) || Benoit (5–4) || Melancon (28) || 21,887 || 49–34
|- bgcolor="ccffcc"
| 84 || July 8 || Padres || 5–2 || Guerra (2–0) || Cashner (3–10) || Bastardo (1) || 25,035 || 50–34
|- bgcolor="ffbbbb"
| 85 || July 9 || Cardinals || 1–4 || Martinez (10–3) || Locke (5–5) || Rosenthal (26) || 35,183 || 50–35
|- bgcolor="ccffcc"
| 86 || July 10 || Cardinals || 5–2 || Cole (13–3) || Lynn (6–5) || Melancon (29) || 36,825 || 51–35
|- bgcolor="ccffcc"
| 87 || July 11 || Cardinals || 6–5 (14) || Worley (3–4) || Greenwood (0–1) || — || 37,318 || 52–35
|- bgcolor="ccffcc"
| 88 || July 12 || Cardinals || 6–5 (10) || Caminero (1–1) || Rosenthal (1–2) || — || 33,544 || 53–35
|- bgcolor=#C6011F
| – ||July 14 || 86th All-Star Game || colspan=6 | National League vs. American League (Great American Ball Park, Cincinnati, Ohio)
|- bgcolor="ffbbbb"
| 89 || July 17 || @ Brewers || 1–4 || Fiers (5–7) || Morton (6–3) || Rodriguez (20) || 32,363 || 53–36
|- bgcolor="ffbbbb"
| 90 || July 18 || @ Brewers || 5–8 || Nelson (7–9) || Worley (3–5) || Rodriguez (21) || 33,104 || 53–37
|- bgcolor="ffbbbb"
| 91 || July 19 || @ Brewers || 1–6 || Jungmann (5–1) || Locke (5–6) || — || 33,835 || 53–38
|- bgcolor="ccffcc"
| 92 || July 20 || @ Royals || 10–7 || Burnett (8–3) || Ventura (4–7) || Melancon (30) || 38,169 || 54–38
|- bgcolor="ffbbbb"
| 93 || July 21 || @ Royals || 1–3 || Davis (6–1) || Cole (13–4) || Holland (21) || 38,163 || 54–39
|- bgcolor="ffbbbb"
| 94 || July 22 || @ Royals || 1–5 || Vólquez (9–5) ||Morton (6–4)  || — || 39,105 || 54–40
|- bgcolor="ccffcc"
| 95 || July 23 || Nationals || 7–3 || Liriano (6–6) || Fister (3–6) || — || 37,799 || 55–40
|- bgcolor="ccffcc"
| 96 || July 24 || Nationals || 7–5 || Worley (4–5) || Solis (1–1) || Melancon (31) || 38,371 || 56–40
|- bgcolor="ffbbbb"
| 97 || July 25 || Nationals ||  3–9 || Gonzalez (8–4) || Burnett (8–4) || — || 38,185 || 56–41
|- bgcolor="ccffcc"
| 98 || July 26 || Nationals || 3–1 || Cole (14–4) || Ross (2–3) || Melancon (32) || 37,597 || 57–41
|- bgcolor="ccffcc"
| 99 || July 28 || @ Twins || 8–7 || Melancon (2–1) || Perkins (0–3) || — || 30,795 || 58–41
|- bgcolor="ccffcc"
| 100 || July 29 || @ Twins || 10–4 || Liriano (7–6) || Santana (2–1) || — || 37,273 || 59–41
|- bgcolor="ffbbbb"
| 101 || July 30 || @ Reds || 5–15 || Holmberg (1–0) || Burnett (8–5) || — || 35,715 || 59–42
|- bgcolor="ccffcc"
| 102 || July 31 || @ Reds || 5–4 || Locke (6–6) || Lorenzen (3–6) || Melancon (33) || 35,088 || 60–42
|-

|- bgcolor="ffbbbb"
| 103 || August 1 || @ Reds || 3–4 || Iglesias (2–3) || Cole (14–5) || Chapman (22) || 42,284 || 60–43
|- bgcolor="ccffcc"
| 104 || August 2 || @ Reds || 3–0 || Morton (7–4) || Sampson (0–1) || Soria (24) || 39,596 || 61–43
|- style="text-align:center; background:#bbb;"
| — || August 3 || Cubs || colspan=6| PPD, RAIN; rescheduled for September 15
|- bgcolor="ffbbbb"
| 105 || August 4 || Cubs || 0–5 || Arrieta (12–6) || Happ (4–7) || — || 34,993 || 61–44
|- bgcolor="ccffcc"
| 106 || August 5 || Cubs || 7–5 || Bastardo (3–1) || Wood (5–4) || Melancon (34) || 35,759 || 62–44
|- bgcolor="ccffcc"
| 107 || August 7 || Dodgers || 5–4 (10) || Bastardo (4–1) || Johnson (2–4) || — || 39,404 || 63–44
|- bgcolor="ccffcc"
| 108 || August 8 || Dodgers || 6–5 || Blanton (3–2) || Latos (4–8) || Melancon (35) || 38,981 || 64–44
|- bgcolor="ccffcc"
| 109 || August 9 || Dodgers || 13–6 || Caminero (2–1) || Johnson (2–5) || — || 37,094 || 65–44
|- bgcolor="ffbbbb"
| 110 || August 11 || @ Cardinals || 3–4 || Martinez (12–4) || Locke (6–7) || Rosenthal (34) || 41,273 || 65–45
|- bgcolor="ffbbbb"
| 111 || August 12 || @ Cardinals || 2–4 || Wacha (14–4) || Cole (14–6) || Rosenthal (35) || 41,493 || 65–46
|- bgcolor="ccffcc"
| 112 || August 13 || @ Cardinals || 10–5 || Liriano (8–6) || Lynn (9–7) || — || 41,501 || 66–46
|- bgcolor="ccffcc"
| 113 || August 14 || @ Mets || 3–2 (10) || Caminero (3–1) || Parnell (1–2) || Melancon (36) || 38,495 || 67–46
|- bgcolor="ccffcc"
| 114 || August 15 || @ Mets || 5–3 (14) || Blanton (4–2) || Gilmartin (1–1) || Melancon (37) || 38,878 || 68–46
|- bgcolor="ccffcc"
| 115 || August 16 || @ Mets || 8–1 || Caminero (4–1) || Parnell (1–3) || — || 40,250 || 69–46
|- bgcolor="ffbbbb"
| 116 || August 17 || Diamondbacks || 1–4 || Hellickson (9–8) || Cole (14–7) || Ziegler (21) || 27,365 || 69–47
|- bgcolor="ccffcc"
| 117 || August 18 || Diamondbacks || 9–8 (15) || Blanton (5–2) || Hessler (0–1) || — || 24,975 || 70–47
|- bgcolor="ccffcc"
| 118 || August 19 || Diamondbacks || 4–1 || Happ (5–7) || Ray (3–9) || Melancon (38) || 32,088 || 71–47
|- bgcolor="ccffcc"
| 119 || August 20 || Giants || 4–0 || Morton (8–4) || Peavy (3–6) || — || 36,671 || 72–47
|- bgcolor="ffbbbb"
| 120 || August 21 || Giants || 4–6 || Bumgarner (15–6) || Locke (6–8) || Casilla (30) || 37,692 || 72–48
|- bgcolor="ccffcc"
| 121 || August 22 || Giants || 3–2 || Melancon (3–1) || Kontos (2–2) || — || 38,259 || 73–48
|- bgcolor="ccffcc"
| 122 || August 23 || Giants || 5–2 || Liriano (9–6) || Vogelsong (9–9) || Melancon (39) || 31,364 || 74–48
|- bgcolor="ccffcc"
| 123 || August 24 || @ Marlins || 5–2 || Happ (6–7) || Koehler (8–12)|| Melancon (40) || 17,644 || 75–48
|- bgcolor="ffbbbb"
| 124 || August 25 || @ Marlins || 2–5 || Hand (4–3) || Morton (8–5) || Ramos (22) || 17,371 || 75–49
|- bgcolor="ccffcc"
| 125 || August 26 || @ Marlins || 7–2 || Locke (7–8) || Narveson (1–1) || — || 16,560 || 76–49
|- bgcolor="ccffcc"
| 126 || August 27 || @ Marlins || 2–1 || Cole (15–7) || Nicolino (2–2) || Melancon (41) || 19,950 || 77–49
|- bgcolor="ccffcc"
| 127 || August 28 || Rockies || 5–3 || Watson (3–1) || Oberg (3–3) || Melancon (42) || 32,607 || 78–49
|- bgcolor="ccffcc"
| 128 || August 29 || Rockies || 4–3 || Happ (7–7) || Rusin (4–7) || Melancon (43) || 35,838 || 79–49
|- bgcolor="ffbbbb"
| 129 || August 30 || Rockies || 0–5 || de la Rosa (8–6) || Morton (8–6) || — || 36,271 || 79–50
|-

|- bgcolor="ffbbbb"
| 130 || September 1 || @ Brewers || 4–7 || Nelson (11–10) || Cole (15–8) || Rodríguez (32) || 18,468 || 79–51
|- bgcolor="ffbbbb"
| 131 || September 2 || @ Brewers || 4–9 || Jeffress (4–0) || Locke (7–9) || — || 24,521 || 79–52
|- bgcolor="ffbbbb"
| 132 || September 3 || @ Brewers || 3–5 || Jungmann (9–5) || Liriano (9–7) || Rodríguez (33) || 22,242 || 79–53
|- bgcolor="ccffcc"
| 133 || September 4 || @ Cardinals || 9–3 || Happ (8–7) || Martinez (13–7) || — || 44,338 || 80–53
|- bgcolor="ffbbbb"
| 134 || September 5 || @ Cardinals || 1–4 || García (8–4)  || Morton (8–7) || — || 45,139 || 80–54
|- bgcolor="ccffcc"
| 135 || September 6 || @ Cardinals || 7–1 || Cole (16–8) || Lackey (11–9) || — || 46,011 || 81–54
|- bgcolor="ffbbbb"
| 136 || September 7 || @ Reds || 1–3 || DeSclafani (8–10) || Locke (7–10) ||  Chapman (29) || 19,241 || 81–55
|- bgcolor="ccffcc"
| 137 || September 8 || @ Reds || 7–3 || Liriano (10–7) || Iglesias (3–7) || — || 16,151 || 82–55
|- bgcolor="ccffcc"
| 138 || September 9 || @ Reds || 5–4 || Happ (9–7) || Sampson (2–4) || Melancon (44) || 19,620 || 83–55
|- bgcolor="ffbbbb"
| 139 || September 10 || Brewers || 4–6 (13) || Rodríguez (1–3) || Liz (1–4) || Lohse (2) || 21,964 || 83–56
|- bgcolor="ccffcc"
| 140 || September 11 || Brewers || 6–3 || Morton (9–7) || Nelson (11–12) ||  Melancon (45) || 28,346 || 84–56
|- bgcolor="ccffcc"
| 141 || September 12 || Brewers || 10–2 || Locke (8–10) || Davies (1–1) || — || 35,749 || 85–56
|- bgcolor="ccffcc"
| 142 || September 13 || Brewers || 7–6 (11) || Hughes (3–1) || Thornburg (0–1) || — || 34,740 || 86–56
|- bgcolor="ccffcc"
| 143 || September 15 || Cubs || 5–4 || Watson (4–1) || Grimm (3–5) || Melancon (46) || 31,488 || 87–56
|- bgcolor="ffbbbb"
| 144 || September 15 || Cubs || 1–2 || Lester (10–10) || Happ (9–8) || — || 25,914 || 87–57
|- bgcolor="ffbbbb"
| 145 || September 16 || Cubs || 2–3 (12) || Rondón (6–4) || Worley (4–6) || — || 31,945 || 87–58
|- bgcolor="ffbbbb"
| 146 || September 17 || Cubs || 6–9 || Richard (4–2) || Morton (9–8) || Wood (2) || 28,228 || 87–59
|- bgcolor="ffbbbb"
| 147 || September 18 || @ Dodgers || 2–6 || Greinke (18–3) || Locke (8–11) || — || 49,529 || 87–60
|- bgcolor="ccffcc"
| 148 || September 19 || @ Dodgers || 3–2 || Liriano (11–7) || Kershaw (14–7) || Melancon (47) || 49,441 || 88–60
|- bgcolor="ccffcc"
| 149 || September 20 || @ Dodgers || 4–3 || Cole (17–8) || Bolsinger (6–4) || Melancon (48) || 47,483 || 89–60
|- bgcolor="ccffcc"
| 150 || September 21 || @ Rockies || 9–3 || Burnett (9–5) || Gray (0–2) || — || 23,187 || 90–60
|- bgcolor="ccffcc"
| 151 || September 22 || @ Rockies || 6–3 || Happ (10–8) || Rusin (5–9) || Melancon (49) || 23,433 || 91–60
|- bgcolor="ccffcc"
| 152 || September 23 || @ Rockies || 13–7 || Blanton (6–2) || Bergman (3–1) || — || 23,526 || 92–60
|- bgcolor="ccffcc"
| 153 || September 24 || @ Rockies || 5–4 || Blanton (7–2) || Diaz (0–1) || Melancon (50) || 25,163 || 93–60
|- bgcolor="ccffcc"
| 154 || September 25 || @ Cubs || 3–2 || Cole (18–8) || Lester (10–12) || Melancon (51) || 40,432 || 94–60
|- bgcolor="ccffcc"
| 155 || September 26 || @ Cubs || 4–0 || Liriano (12–7) || Hammel (9–7) || — || 41,150 || 95–60
|- bgcolor="ffbbbb"
| 156 || September 27 || @ Cubs || 0–4 || Arrieta (21–6) || Burnett (9–6) || — || 40,617 || 95–61
|- bgcolor="ffbbbb"
| 157 || September 28 || Cardinals || 0–3 || Broxton (4–5) || Melancon (3–2) || Rosenthal (48) || 30,198 || 95–62
|- style="text-align:center; background:#bbb;"
| —  || September 29 || Cardinals || colspan=6| PPD, RAIN; rescheduled for September 30
|- bgcolor="ccffcc"
| 158 || September 30 || Cardinals || 8–2 || Cole (19–8) || Wacha (17–7) || — || 29,747 || 96–62
|- bgcolor="ffbbbb"
| 159 || September 30 || Cardinals || 1–11 || Lyons (3–1) || Morton (9–9) || — || 34,729 || 96–63
|-

|- bgcolor="ccffcc"
| 160 || October 2 || Reds || 6–4 (12) || Caminero (5–1) || Balester (1–1) || — || 31,442 || 97–63
|- bgcolor="ffbbbb"
| 161 || October 3 || Reds || 1–3 || Finnegan (5–2) || Burnett (9–7) || Chapman (33) || 34,180 || 97–64
|- bgcolor="ccffcc"
| 162 || October 4 || Reds || 4–0 || Happ (11–8) || Smith (0–4) || — || 35,362 || 98–64
|-

|-
| Legend:       = Win       = Loss       = PostponementBold = Pirates team member

Postseason

Wild Card Game

October 7 – National League Wild Card game – Chicago's Jake Arrieta pitched a complete game, striking out eleven batters and allowing only five hits. The Cubs were paced offensively by Dexter Fowler  and Kyle Schwarber, both combining for five hits in seven at bats, each with a home run. Pittsburgh starter Gerrit Cole gave up two home runs in a game for the first time this season. Cole lasted five innings, striking out four.

Game log

|- bgcolor="ffbbbb"
| 1 || October 7 || Cubs || 0–4 || Arrieta (1–0) || Cole (0–1) || — || 40,889 || 0–1
|-

|- style="text-align:center;"
| Legend:       = Win       = LossBold = Pirates team member

| style="text-align:left" |
Pitchers: 35 Mark Melancon 37 Arquimedes Caminero 38 Joakim Soria 44 Tony Watson 45 Gerrit Cole 47 Francisco Liriano 48 Jared Hughes 55 Joe Blanton 59 Antonio Bastardo 
Catchers: 19 Chris Stewart 29 Francisco Cervelli 66 Elías Díaz 
Infielders: 3 Sean Rodriguez 5 Josh Harrison 10 Jordy Mercer 17 Aramis Ramírez 18 Neil Walker 24 Pedro Álvarez 31 Michael Morse 51 Pedro Florimón
Outfielders: 6 Starling Marte 22 Andrew McCutchen 23 Travis Snider 25 Gregory Polanco 60 Keon Broxton 
|- valign="top"

Roster

Opening Day lineup

Disabled lists

15-day disabled list

60-day disabled list

Notable achievements

Awards

2015 Baseball America Organization of the Year

2015 National League Saves Leader
Mark Melancon

2015 Roberto Clemente Award
Andrew McCutchen

2015 Trevor Hoffman Award
Mark Melancon

Silver Slugger Award
Andrew McCutchen

Wilson Defensive Player of the Year Award
Starling Marte (LF)

2015 Major League Baseball All-Star Game
A. J. Burnett, P, reserve
Gerrit Cole, P, reserve
Andrew McCutchen, OF, reserve (starting in place of Giancarlo Stanton)
Mark Melancon, P, reserve

NL Pitcher of the Month
Gerrit Cole (April)

NL Rookie of the Month
Jung-ho Kang (July)

NL Player of the Week
Andrew McCutchen (May 18–24)
Andrew McCutchen (August 3–9)

NL Player of the Month
Andrew McCutchen (August)

Milestones

Statistics

Players

Final stats for 2015
Batting
Note: G = Games played; AB = At bats; H = Hits; Avg. = Batting average; HR = Home runs; RBI = Runs batted in

Pitching
Note: G = Games pitched; IP = Innings pitched; W = Wins; L = Losses; ERA = Earned run average; SO = Strikeouts

Legend
– Stats reflect time with the Pirates only.
† – Denotes player was acquired during season.
‡ – Denotes player was relinquished during season.
 – Injured reserve.
 – Qualified for batting title (3.1 plate appearances per team game) or ERA title (1 inning pitched per team game)

Transactions
The Pirates were involved in the following transactions during the 2015 season:
 Black line marks the transition between off season and regular season

Trades

Notes
 – Buddy Borden fulfilled on December 12, 2014.
 – Steven Brault fulfilled on February 20, 2015.

Free agents

Waivers

Signings

Other

Legend
  – invited to training camp

Draft picks

Notes
 Compensation pick for the Toronto Blue Jays signing Russell Martin.

Farm system
LEAGUE CHAMPIONS: West Virginia Black Bears

References

External links
2015 Pittsburgh Pirates statistics at Baseball Reference
2015 Pittsburgh Pirates schedule at MLB.com

Pittsburgh Pirates seasons
Pittsburgh Pirates
Pittsburgh Pirates